Parag Das (born 1 January 1974 in Gauhati, Assam) is an Indian cricketer who played domestic cricket for Assam cricket team. He is a right-handed batsman who bowled right-arm medium pace. Das made his first-class debut for Assam in the 1993/94 Ranji Trophy. He played 43 first-class matches with highest score of 118 and 32 List A matches.

His son is Riyan Parag, who also plays cricket for Assam.

References

External links
 
 

1976 births
Living people
Indian cricketers
Assam cricketers
East Zone cricketers
Cricketers from Guwahati